Warid may refer to:

Religion
 Warid, a concept in Sufism

People
 Waride Jabu, a Tanzanian politician

Companies
 Warid Telecom, a United Arab Emirates telecommunication company held by Abu Dhabi Group
 Warid Pakistan, a mobile network operator in Pakistan
 Warid Congo, a mobile operator in the Republic of Congo
 Warid Bangladesh, a mobile network operator in Bangladesh